Oxford Blood is a crime novel by Antonia Fraser first published in 1985.

The novel begins with reporter Jemima Shore making a television documentary at Oxford University. Most prominent among the undergraduates is Lord Saffron, a wealthy, twenty-year-old heir to a former (British) Foreign Secretary. Soon she discovers that there is a mystery about Lord Saffron's birth and bloodline, based on the confession of a dying midwife. Later another undergraduate is murdered, and a series of attempts are made to kill Saffron, including a night-time attack while punting on the River Thames.

References

1985 British novels
British crime novels
Novels set in University of Oxford
Novels by Antonia Fraser
Weidenfeld & Nicolson books
W. W. Norton & Company books